Ifeanyi Ohalete (born May 22, 1979) is a former American football strong safety in National Football League (NFL). He played college football at USC.

Early life
Ohalete born Springfield, Illinois.  He attended and played football for Los Alamitos High School.

College career
Ohalete played college football at the University of Southern California.  He is remembered by many USC Trojans fans as the player who committed an unnecessary roughness penalty after a failed fourth down attempt giving the University of Notre Dame a crucial first down and allowing the Irish to complete a 21-point second half comeback in 1999.

Professional career
Ohalete played for the Arizona Cardinals in 2004.  He came to Arizona on waivers from the Washington Redskins, where he played 47 games with 24 starts from 2001–2003.  He entered the NFL with Washington in 2001 as a college free agent.

Ohalete played the 2005 season as the starting Strong Safety for the eventual 2005 AFC North Division Champion Cincinnati Bengals.

He played in 2007 for the New York Dragons of the Arena Football League, and was second on the team in tackles.

NFL statistics

Key
 GP: games played
 COMB: combined tackles
 TOTAL: total tackles
 AST: assisted tackles
 SACK: sacks
 FF: forced fumbles
 FR: fumble recoveries
 FR YDS: fumble return yards 
 INT: interceptions
 IR YDS: interception return yards
 AVG IR: average interception return
 LNG: longest interception return
 TD: interceptions returned for touchdown
 PD: passes defensed

Personal
Ohalete is of Nigerian descent.  His father is a Nigerian immigrant from Mbano in Imo State.

Ohalete ran into some drama in 2004 with Clinton Portis of the Washington Redskins.  Portis came to the Redskins in a blockbuster trade that involved Pro Bowl cornerback Champ Bailey.  Portis had worn the number 26, and Ohalete had the number. Portis agreed to buy the rights to the number from Ohalete, but Ohalete later sued Portis to force payment.  The case was settled before trial, but not before Portis challenged Ohalete to a boxing match to determine the rightful owner of the number.  The match never happened.

References

External links
 

1979 births
Living people
American football safeties
USC Trojans football players
Cincinnati Bengals players
Washington Redskins players
New York Dragons players